The 1994 Tulsa Golden Hurricane football team represented the University of Tulsa during the 1994 NCAA Division I-A football season. In their seventh year under head coach David Rader, the Golden Hurricane compiled a 3–8 record.  The team's statistical leaders included quarterback John Fitzgerald with 1,409 passing yards, Solomon White with 1,003 rushing yards, and Wes Caswell with 893 receiving yards.

Schedule

References

Tulsa
Tulsa Golden Hurricane football seasons
Tulsa Golden Hurricane football